The 1994 IAAF World Road Relay Championships was the second edition of the global, international marathon relay competition, organised by the International Association of Athletics Federations (IAAF). The event took place on 16–17 April on a 5-kilometre circuit in Litochoro, Greece with the participation of 240 athletes (162 men and 78 women) from 23 nations. The women's race took place on Saturday 16 April and the men's race took place on Sunday 17 April.

Each national team consisted of six athletes, who alternately covered six stages to complete the 42.195 km marathon distance. The first, third and fifth stages were of 5 km, the second and fourth stages were of 10 km, and the final stage covered the remaining 7.195 km.

In the women's race, Askale Bereda and Derartu Tulu ran the fastest times of the first two stages to establish a 40-second lead for Ethiopia. On the third leg, Yelena Kopytova made up this deficit to give the Russians a 6-second lead. Her compatriots Olga Churbanova and Yelena Romanova won the final two stages to take gold for Russia in a time of 2:17:19 hours. Ethiopia were a comfortable second in 2:19:09 hours, while Romania took third nine seconds behind with the help of fourth stage winner Anuța Cătună.

In the men's race, Worku Bikila gained a five-second lead for Ethiopia in the first leg. A fast second leg from Joseph Kibor, saw Kenya take the lead by 12 seconds. Hicham El Guerrouj made up half a minute on the third leg to take the lead for Morocco. Salah Hissou and Brahim Boutayeb won the next two stages to cement the lead for Morocco resulting in a championship record time of 1:57:56 hours. Just under a minute behind were Ethiopia in 1:58:51, courtesy of leg six winner Haile Gebrselassie. Kenya finished a clear third in 2:00:51 hours.

Medal summary

Stage winners

Results

Men's race

Women's race

References

1994
World Road Relay Championships
World Road Relay Championships
World Road Relay Championships
April 1994 sports events in Europe
Sport in Central Macedonia
International athletics competitions hosted by Greece
Marathons in Greece